The Skarnsund Bridge ( or ) is a  long concrete cable-stayed bridge that crosses the Skarnsundet strait, in the municipality of Inderøy in Trøndelag county, Norway. When finished in 1991, it replaced the Vangshylla–Kjerringvik Ferry and it gives the communities in the municipalities of Mosvik and Leksvik easier access to the central areas of Innherred. The bridge is the only road crossing of the Trondheimsfjord, and is located along Norwegian County Road 755.

Following the opening, there was a seventeen-year collection of tolls, needed to finance 30% of the  investment. In 2007, the bridge was listed as a cultural heritage. In 2012, the municipalities of Mosvik and Inderøy (on either side of the bridge) were merged to form one large municipality of Inderøy.

Background

Prior to its 2012 merger with Inderøy, Mosvik was a separate municipality on the Fosen peninsula and part of the old Nord-Trøndelag county. The first automotive transport from Mosvik to the more populated area of Innherred commenced in 1958, when the ferry company Innherredsferja started the Levanger–Hokstad–Vangshylla–Kjerringvik–Venneshamn route. In 1964, the road between Kjerringvik and Vennesham, both in Mosvik, opened, and a new ferry was purchased, establishing the Vangshylla–Kjerringvik Ferry.

The ferry, and subsequently the bridge, is located at the narrowest section of Skarnsundet, between the villages of Kjerringvik and Vangshylla. In addition to Mosvik, the bridge also caters for the larger municipality Leksvik (now part of Indre Fosen municipality), further out down the fjord. The bridge is the only one to cross the Trondheimsfjord.

History

The first meeting of local commercial and political interests to establish a bridge was made in 1972. By 1983, it was formalized by the establishment of the company AS Skarnsundsbrua to finance construction. The Parliament of Norway passed the plans in 1986, and construction started two years later. The main contractor was Aker; and after the bridge was finished, maintenance was taken over by the Nord-Trøndelag Public Roads Administration. The bridge cost . The bridge was opened by King Harald V on 19 December 1991, after he had taken the last ferry across the fjord. A monument, the King's Stone, bearing the signature of the king, is located at the resting place on the Mosvik side.

Following the opening, it won several awards: Betongtavlen (1992); Beautiful Roads Award (1994); and the international FIP Award (1994). In 2008, the Norwegian Directorate for Cultural Heritage listed the bridge as a protected cultural heritage. In 2010, the bridge came in second in a competition held by Teknisk Ukeblad to declare Norway's most beautiful road bridge.

Specifications

It is the longest concrete cable-stayed span. The bridge was, on its completion, the longest cable-stayed bridge in the world by the length of main span, but has since lost the title.

The original construction work also included  of new road, including a resting place on the Mosvik side. The bridge's foundations are bedrock below the seabed under each tower.

Financing
Toll collection started the day after the opening, and lasted until 24 May 2007. Seventy percent of the costs were to be covered by the state, and thirty percent through toll fees. The debt was borrowed by the private company that was given a concession to operate a toll plaza on the Inderøy side. Including interest, NOK 80 million was collected, and the bridge was paid off three years before schedule. The Vanvikan-based company was disestablished following the closure of the plaza. Until only a few years before the closing, it was the only toll plaza in Nord-Trøndelag. There were several price increases during the toll period. The bridge was free for pedestrians and cyclists, but all motor vehicles were charged, although discounts were available for frequent travelers. The plaza was staffed, and did not take into use Autopass, like many other plazas.

See also

List of longest cable-stayed bridge spans
List of tallest bridges in the world

References

Road bridges in Trøndelag
Cable-stayed bridges in Norway
Former toll bridges in Norway
Norwegian County Road 755
Bridges completed in 1991
1991 establishments in Norway
Inderøy
Trondheimsfjord